A comfort zone is a psychological state in which things feel  familiar to a person and they are at ease and (perceive they are) in control of their environment, experiencing low levels of anxiety and stress. 

Bardwick defines the term as "a behavioral state where a person operates in an anxiety-neutral position." Brené Brown describes it as "Where our uncertainty, scarcity and vulnerability are minimized—where we believe we'll have access to enough love, food, talent, time, admiration. Where we feel we have some control."

Performance management

White (2009) refers to the "optimal performance zone", in which performance can be enhanced by some amount of stress. Beyond the optimum performance zone, lies the "danger zone" in which performance declines rapidly under the influence of greater anxiety.

However, stress in general can have an adverse effect on decision making: fewer alternatives are tried out and more familiar strategies are used, even if they are not helpful anymore.

Optimal performance management requires maximizing time in the optimum performance zone. The main target should be expanding the comfort zone and optimal performance zone.

See also
 Flow (psychology)
 Personal boundaries
 Yerkes–Dodson law

References 

Personality
Sociological theories